Jussey is a commune in the Haute-Saône department in the region of Bourgogne-Franche-Comté in eastern France. The 18th-century French writer Pierre Légier (1734–1791) was born in the village.

See also
Communes of the Haute-Saône department

References

Communes of Haute-Saône